Tomlinson-Huddleston House, also known as The Signature House, is a historic home located in Langhorne, Bucks County, Pennsylvania. It was built in 1783, and is a -story, three bay, stone dwelling with a gable roof in the Georgian style.  It has a two-story, rear brick and frame addition with a gable roof added about 1820.  Another frame addition was added to the rear about 1965.  The oldest section features a total of nine stones with carved initials, names, and dates. The house was restored in the 1940s.

It was added to the National Register of Historic Places in 1983.  It is located in the Langhorne Historic District, listed in 1987.

References

External links
 
 Historic Langhorne Association website: The Signature House

Houses on the National Register of Historic Places in Pennsylvania
Georgian architecture in Pennsylvania
Houses completed in 1783
Houses in Bucks County, Pennsylvania
Historic district contributing properties in Pennsylvania
National Register of Historic Places in Bucks County, Pennsylvania